Together (Z) is a political party in Serbia. It was formed on 11 June 2022 as a merger of Together for Serbia, Ecological Uprising, and Assembly of Free Serbia, which were a part of the We Must coalition that took part in the 2022 general election.

History 
Following the 2022 general election, Aleksandar Jovanović Ćuta and Nebojša Zelenović, who at that time were the leaders of the Ecological Uprising and Together for Serbia respectively, announced that they would hold a form a political party in June 2022. Additionally, Zelenović stated that the party would composed of three co-leaders and that its members of the City Assembly of Belgrade would have influence on how the party would work. Zelenović also stated that Biljana Stojković, Ćuta, and himself would serve as co-leaders. 

Its representatives previously signed a joint merger declaration shortly before the European Green Party congress in Riga, which was held between 3 and 5 June, in which they also participated. During the founding assembly on 11 June 2022, representatives of the party had announced their political ambitions. Zelenović also announced that the We Must (Moramo) coalition, which it is a part of, would begin a "green campaign" somewhere during June; the campaign, named "Green Wave", began on 23 June 2022. A week later, Together held a meeting with Party of Freedom and Justice (SSP) and Zdravko Ponoš. It was noted that the Do not let Belgrade drown (NDB) movement, the other member of the We Must coalition, did not participate in the meeting. Together stated their support for the environmental protests that were organised in Novi Sad in late July. In August 2022, Zelenović became the president of the Together parliamentary group in the National Assembly, while Ćuta became the vice-president. In January 2023, Solidarity, which was a part of Moramo, merged into Together.

Political positions 
Regarding social issues, Together is positioned on the left-wing on the political spectrum. In its announcement during its founding assembly, the party defined itself as a green-left organisation that would insist for labour rights and social justice. It also stated its support for environmental protection, energy transition, and direct democracy. 

It is supportive of the accession of Serbia to the European Union. Together supported the manifestation of EuroPride in Belgrade. In October 2022, it announced its support for sanctioning Russia due to their invasion of Ukraine.

Leadership

References 

2022 establishments in Serbia
Political parties established in 2022
Left-wing parties in Serbia